Spontaneous Combustion is a 1990 American science fiction horror film directed by Tobe Hooper. It was written by Tobe Hooper and Howard Goldberg, based on a story by Hooper, and is a co-production between Henry Bushkin, Sanford Hampton, Jerrold W. Lambert, Jim Rogers and Arthur M. Sarkissian.

It was nominated for best film in the 1991 Fantasporto International Fantasy Film Awards.

Plot 

Sam learns that his parents were part of an atomic bomb experiment. As an adult, Sam discovers he has the power of pyrokinesis. He is able to control fire and electricity, but with terrible consequences to his body afterwards.

Cast
 Brad Dourif as Sam Kramer/David Bell
 Cynthia Bain as Lisa Wilcox
 Jon Cypher as Dr. Marsh
 William Prince as Lew Orlander
 Melinda Dillon as Nina
 Dey Young as Rachel
 Stacy Edwards as Peggy Bell
 Brian Bremer as Brian Bell
 Barbara Leary as Amy Whitaker
 Michael Keys Hall as Dr. Cagney
 Joe Mays as Dr. Persons
 John Landis as Radio Technician
 André de Toth as Vandenmeer (uncredited)
 Mark Roberts as Dr. Simpson
 Dick Warlock as Mr. Fitzpatrick
 Paul Barresi as hospital security Guard
 Tegan West as Springer

Critical reception 

Spin magazine, while writing, "no one makes bad movies as deliriously entertaining as Tobe Hooper, whose career continues its spectacular downward slide with Spontaneous Combustion", gave the film an overall favorable review. John Kenneth Muir, in his book Horror Films of the 1980s, wrote, "Spontaneous Combustion commences on a high note of creativity and wit, but then promptly goes down in flames."

References

External links 
 
 
 
 

1990 films
1990 horror films
1990 independent films
1990s science fiction horror films
1990s English-language films
Fictional characters with fire or heat abilities
Films scored by Graeme Revell
Films directed by Tobe Hooper
American independent films
American science fiction horror films
1990s American films